Krystian Nowak (born 1 April 1994) is a Polish professional footballer who plays as a centre-back for League of Ireland team Bohemians.

Career
Nowak signed a two-year contract with Scottish Premiership club Heart of Midlothian in August 2016. Nowak made his Hearts debut on 23 December against Dundee. He only played once after Craig Levein was appointed manager in September 2017, and he was allowed to leave in January 2018.

Career statistics

References

External links
 
 

1994 births
Living people
Polish footballers
Poland youth international footballers
Poland under-21 international footballers
People from Ełk
UKS SMS Łódź players
Tur Turek players
Widzew Łódź players
Podbeskidzie Bielsko-Biała players
Heart of Midlothian F.C. players
NK Slaven Belupo players
Panionios F.C. players
FC Universitatea Cluj players
Bohemian F.C. players
Ekstraklasa players
II liga players
I liga players
Scottish Professional Football League players
Croatian Football League players
Super League Greece players
Association football defenders
Expatriate footballers in Croatia
Expatriate footballers in Scotland
Expatriate footballers in Greece
Expatriate footballers in Romania
Expatriate association footballers in the Republic of Ireland
Polish expatriate sportspeople in Scotland
Polish expatriate sportspeople in Croatia
Polish expatriate sportspeople in Greece
Polish expatriate sportspeople in Romania
Polish expatriate sportspeople in Ireland